Terry Mornington David MacGill (born 22 December 1945) is an Australian former cricketer. He played twelve first-class matches for Western Australia between 1968 and 1972. His father, Charlie MacGill, and his son, Stuart MacGill also played first-class cricket for Western Australia, with Stuart also playing 44 Tests for Australia. MacGill was also the professional at the Todmorden Cricket Club in the Lancashire League in 1970.

See also
 List of Western Australia first-class cricketers

References

1945 births
Australian cricketers
Living people
Cricketers from Melbourne
Western Australia cricketers
People from Brunswick, Victoria
Australian expatriate cricketers in the United Kingdom
Australian expatriate sportspeople in England